Exitsect is a band. It features Paul Pavlovich (of Assück), Sam Williams, Frank Watkins (of Obituary and Gorgoroth), Greg Gall (of Six Feet Under) and Joe Kiser (of Murder-Suicide Pact, Slap Of Reality and Paineater.

References

Supergroups (music)